A coleopter is a type of VTOL aircraft design that uses a ducted fan as the primary fuselage of the entire aircraft. Generally they appear to be a large barrel-like extension at the rear, with a small cockpit area suspended above it. Coleopters are generally designed as tail-sitters. The term is an anglicisation of the French coléoptère "beetle" after the first actual implementation of this design, the SNECMA Coléoptère of the mid-1950s.

The first design of an aircraft clearly using the coleopter concept was developed during World War II. From 1944 on, the Luftwaffe was suffering from almost continual daytime attacks on its airfields and was finding it almost impossible to conduct large-scale operations. Their preferred solution was to introduce some sort of VTOL interceptor that could be launched from any open location, and there were many proposals for such a system. Heinkel conducted a series of design studies as part of their Heinkel Wespe and Heinkel Lerche programs. The Wespe intended to use a Benz 2,000 hp turboprop engine, but these were not forthcoming and the Lerche used two Daimler-Benz DB 605 piston engines instead. Nothing ever came of either design.

In the immediate post-war era, most VTOL research involved helicopters. However, as the limitations of the simple rotary wing became clear, teams started looking for other solutions and many turned to using jet engines directly for vertical thrust. SNECMA (now Safran Aircraft Engines) developed a series of such systems as part of the SNECMA Atar Volant series during the 1950s. To further improve the design, SNECMA had Nord Aviation build an annular wing and adapted it to the last of the Volant series to produce the SNECMA Coléoptère. The Coléoptère first flew on 6 May 1959, but crashed on 25 July and no replacement was built. Even in this limited testing period, the design showed several serious problems related to the high angular momentum of the engine, which made control tricky.

In the US, Hiller Aircraft had been working on a number of ducted fan flying platforms originally designed by Charles Zimmerman. After some early successes, the Army demanded a series of changes that continued to increase the size and weight of the platform, which introduced new stability problems. These generally required more size and power to correct, and no satisfactory design came from these efforts. Instead, Hiller approached the Navy with the idea of building a full coleopter design. This emerged as the Hiller VXT-8 which was significantly similar to the SNECMA design, although it used a propeller instead of a jet engine. However, the introduction of turbine-powered helicopters like the Bell UH-1 Iroquois so significantly improved their performance over piston-powered designs that the Navy lost interest in the VXT-8 in spite of even better estimated performance. Only a mock-up was completed.

Convair selected the coleopter layout for their Model 49 proposal, entered into the Advanced Aerial Fire Support System (AAFSS). AAFSS asked for a new high-speed helicopter design for the attack and escort roles, and gathered an impressive array of gyrodynes, dual-rotor designs and similar advances on conventional designs, but nothing was as unconventional as the Model 49. The Army "went conventional" however, and selected the Lockheed AH-56 Cheyenne and Sikorsky S-66 for further development.

See also
 Focke-Wulf Triebflügel

References
 Jay Spenser, Vertical Challenge: The Hiller Aircraft Story, University of Washington Press, 1998
 Tony Landis and Dennis Jenkins, Lockheed AH-56A Cheyenne, Specialty Press Publishers and Wholesalers, 2000

External links
 A Coleopter patent
 Description of and plans for building a model coleopter

Aircraft configurations
Rotorcraft
Tailsitter aircraft